Datuk Seri Ruslin bin Hasan (born 10 July 1949) is a Malaysian politician who was the 7th Mayor of Kuala Lumpur.

Honours 
 :
 Member of the Order of the Defender of the Realm (A.M.N.) (1984)
 Officer of the Order of the Defender of the Realm (K.M.N.) (1996)
 Commander of the Order of Meritorious Service (P.J.N.)	- Datuk (2006)

 Companion Class I of the Exalted Order of Malacca (D.M.S.M.) - Datuk (2001)

 Grand Commander of the Order of the Territorial Crown (S.M.W.) - Datuk Seri (2013)

References 

Mayors of Kuala Lumpur
Members of the Order of the Defender of the Realm
Officers of the Order of the Defender of the Realm
Commanders of the Order of Meritorious Service
Living people
1949 births